Nishada melanistis is a moth of the family Erebidae first described by Charles Swinhoe in 1902. It is found on Borneo and Sulawesi.

Adults have dark brown forewings with a yellow costa. The hindwings are yellow with a brown border.

References

Lithosiina
Moths described in 1902